The "false positives" scandal was a series of murders in Colombia, part of the armed conflict in that country between the government and guerrilla forces of the FARC and the ELN. Members of the military had poor or mentally impaired civilians lured to remote parts of the country with offers of work, killed them, and presented them to authorities as guerrilleros killed in battle, in an effort to inflate body counts and receive promotions or other benefits. While Colombian investigative agencies find cases as early as 1988 the peak of the phenomenon took place between 2006 and 2009, during the presidency of Álvaro Uribe Vélez.

As of June 2012, a total of 3,350 such cases had been investigated in all parts of the country and verdicts had been reached in 170 cases. Human rights groups have charged that the judicial cases progressed too slowly. The Special Jurisdiction for Peace (JEP) in a February 2021 report established the total number of victims to be 6,402 between 2002 and 2008. An article from "The Guardian" shows a 2018 study claiming a total of 10,000 "false positive" victims between 2002 and 2010.

The name of the scandal refers to the technical term of "false positive" which describes a test falsely detecting a condition that is not present.

2008 Soacha case
As a precedent between August 7, 2002 and August 6, 2004, more than six thousand people were released from liberty, violating agreements and norms established within human rights. Many of the cases lacked due process. Thus, for this period there were arrests without substantiated evidence, mass arrests that ignored international law amid military operations and arrests used as a mechanism for political persecution.

The scandal broke in 2008, when 22 men from Soacha who had been recruited for work were found dead several hundred miles away. A recruiter later testified that he had received $500 from the Colombian military for each man he recruited and delivered to them. In June 2012, six members of the army were sentenced to long prison sentences in that case.

After the 2008 Soacha discoveries, defense minister Juan Manuel Santos denied knowledge of the scheme, fired 27 officers including three generals and changed the army's body count system. General Mario Montoya, commander of the Colombian Army, resigned on November 4, 2008. President Alvaro Uribe ordered the cases to be handled by civilian courts to ensure impartiality.

According to reports in 2009, both Defense Minister Santos and President Uribe have claimed that there were cases of false denunciations where legitimate killings were presented as "false positives" in order to stain the name of the military and undermine military morale.

Earlier cases
Accusations of similar cases had occurred much earlier. A recently declassified 1990 cable by U.S. Ambassador Thomas McNamara reported on a case involving nine men who were killed by the military, dressed in military fatigues and presented as guerrilleros. Similar extrajudicial executions have been reported throughout the 1990s.

UN investigation and report, 2009
In June 2009, UN special rapporteur Philip Alston carried out an investigation of extrajudicial executions in Colombia. He reported:

Trials 
In 2011, a colonel of the Colombian army received a sentence of 21 years in prison for his admitted involvement in the killing of two peasants who were then presented as guerrilleros. He also admitted that his unit had carried out 57 similar murders. He claimed that he learned of previous "false positive" killings when he first arrived at his unit, and was warned by Defence Minister Santos to obtain measurable results or lose his position. He later testified at other "false positive" trials. In 2013 a Colombian radio station played a tape on which the colonel is overheard extorting other army members with offers not to testify against them.

Recent developments
The International Federation for Human Rights produced a report on the scandal in May 2012, alleging over 3,000 civilian victims between 2002 and 2008. The group asked the Prosecutor of the International Criminal Court prosecutor to open an investigation, as "those who bear the greatest responsibility for these crimes are not being investigated or prosecuted in Colombia."

Former defense minister Santos was elected President of Colombia in 2010; in 2012 he backed legislation that has been criticized by human rights groups because they fear it could potentially revert the "false positive" cases to military courts.

The text of a 2013 law which regulated and implemented the previous 2012 reform includes extrajudicial executions among a list of crimes which will continue to remain under civilian court jurisdiction and will not be submitted to military courts. Critics have expressed concern that the defense lawyers of military personnel accused in false positive cases may argue that their crimes are not extrajudicial executions (which were previously not defined as a crime in the Colombian penal code) but homicides, as a way to avoid the jurisdiction of civilian courts and request a transfer to military courts. Legislators who supported the bill have argued that another paragraph in the law expressly states that cases of false positives currently in civilian justice cannot be transferred to the military justice system.
According to the report of the working group on the arbitrary detention of the United Nations, arbitrary deprivation of liberty has been used in other countries as one of the most common practices to imprison political opponents, religious dissidents or to restrict the freedom of expression, it has been found that these imprisonments are also based on the fight against terrorism.

Human Rights Watch report of 2015 and consequences 
In June 2015, Human Rights Watch presented a report on the scandal. At that point, about 800 people, mostly ordinary soldiers, had been convicted in related cases. The report criticized that the majority of cases had been handled by military courts, in contradiction to a Supreme Court ruling.  Military judges had suppressed evidence and manipulated crime scenes. Whistleblowers were punished.

According to the report, both commander of the armed forces General Juan Pablo Rodríguez and top army chief General Jaime Lasprilla had formerly headed units that committed extrajudicial killings. In July 2016, President Santos rejected the report's claims that high military commanders had escaped punishment for extrajudicial killings. At the same time, he dismissed General Jaime Alfonso Lasprilla, marine commander Admiral Hernando Wills, and air force commander General Guillermo León.

See also 
 Massacre of El Amparo, a 1988 event where Venezuelan military and police falsely claimed they were attacked by guerillas and killed 14 fishermen
 2021 Apure clashes

References

External links
Philip Alston final report, 31 March 2010
Colombia. The war is measured in litres of bood., FIDH report, May 2012
Colombia: Top Brass Linked to Extrajudicial Executions, Human Rights Watch report, June 2015

Colombian conflict
20th century in Colombia
21st century in Colombia
Extrajudicial killings
Political scandals in Colombia
Killings by law enforcement officers